Milton's Secret is a 2016 Canadian family-drama film directed by Barnet Bain, based on the novel of the same name by the author Eckhart Tolle, which was released in 2008. It stars Donald Sutherland, Michelle Rodriguez, Mia Kirshner, David Sutcliffe and William Ainscough as Milton. The film was released on September 30, 2016 in the United States.

Cast 
 Donald Sutherland as Grandpa Howard
 Michelle Rodriguez as Ms. Ferguson
 William Ainscough as Milton Adams
 Mia Kirshner as Jane Adams, Milton's mother
 David Sutcliffe as Bill Adams, Milton's father
 Ella Ballentine as Anna
 Hays Wellford as Tim
 Percy Hynes White as Carter
 Milo Larratt as Robbie

Production 
Donald Sutherland signed on to the cast on 23 July 2015. On October 8, 2015, Michelle Rodriguez joined the cast, stating that she will star in a Canadian drama film, after the release of Furious 7. This is Donald Sutherland's first film in leading role in nearly a decade. The role of Grandpa Howard originally belonged to Peter Fonda.

Filming locations included Vancouver, British Columbia; Hamilton and Brampton, Ontario, Canada.

Release 
Momentum Pictures released the film. This is Donald's second project with Momentum, the first being a collaboration with his son, Kiefer Sutherland, the drama-Western, Forsaken. The first trailer and poster for the film was announced on August 8, 2016, with the tagline: "Be here. Now."

The film had its world premiere at the Vancouver International Film Festival on September 30, 2016.

Reception 
On Rotten Tomatoes the film has an approval rating of 38% based on reviews from 13 critics. On Metacritic the film has a score of 37% based on reviews from 6 critics, indicating "generally unfavorable reviews".

References

External links
 
 
 

2016 films
Canadian drama films
English-language Canadian films
2016 drama films
Films based on non-fiction books
2010s English-language films
2010s Canadian films